Long Island is a member of the Whitsunday Island group off the east coast of Queensland, Australia. Long Island is the closest island in the Whitsunday group to the mainland of Australia, being only  from the coastline. A boat transfer to the island from Shute Harbour on the mainland takes 20 minutes.

Most of the island is national area, including  of tropical rainforest and 20 kilometres of bush walking paths.

Whitsunday Islands